Mavis Adjei is a Ghanaian actress currently based in The Netherlands.

Early life and education 
Adjei hails from the diamond town of Akwatia in the Eastern Region of Ghana. She had her secondary education at Swedru Secondary School in the Central Region of Ghana from 1994 to 1996.

Career 
With over 25 films to her credit, her film roles include notable performances in Amsterdam Diary, Love & Politics, Church Money, Obaa pa, Salãm and many others. She also starred in numerous soap series in Ghana.

Personal life 
Adjei lives in the Netherlands with her children: two daughters, Tyra and Kayla, and her son, Kieran.

References

Year of birth missing (living people)
Ghanaian film actresses
Living people
Ghanaian emigrants to the Netherlands